Milan Horálek (27 November 1931 in Rájec-Jestřebí – 13 November 2012) was a Czech economist and politician. He served as the Minister of Labour and Social Affairs of the former Czechoslovakia from 1990 to 1992. Horálek died on 13 November 2012, at the age of 80.

References

1931 births
2012 deaths
People from Rájec-Jestřebí
Communist Party of Czechoslovakia politicians
Government ministers of Czechoslovakia
Civic Movement Government ministers
Czechoslovak economists
Prague University of Economics and Business alumni